Đorđe Đurić (Serbian Cyrillic: Ђорђе Ђурић, born 24 April 1971) is a Serbian volleyball player who competed for Yugoslavia in the 1996 Summer Olympics.

He was born in Ljubinje, Bosnia and Herzegovina, Yugoslavia.

In 1996 he was part of the Yugoslav team which won the bronze medal in the Olympic tournament. He played five matches.

References 
 

1971 births
Living people
Serbian men's volleyball players
Serbia and Montenegro men's volleyball players
Yugoslav men's volleyball players
Volleyball players at the 1996 Summer Olympics
Olympic volleyball players of Yugoslavia
Olympic bronze medalists for Federal Republic of Yugoslavia
Olympic medalists in volleyball
People from Ljubinje
Medalists at the 1996 Summer Olympics
Serbian expatriate sportspeople in Italy
Serbian expatriate sportspeople in Greece